The Raid on Norias Ranch was an incident in August 1915 in which a large band of Mexican Seditionistas attacked an American ranch in southern Texas. It became one of the many small battles fought on American soil during the Mexican Revolution and resulted in an increased effort by the United States Army to defend the international border. At least seven people were killed in the raid and several more from among those wounded by gunfire may have died immediately afterwards.

Background
In January 1915 a group of Mexican rebels drafted the Plan of San Diego which called for Mexicans in the American border states to rebel against the U.S. government and kill the white inhabitants. However, the overall plan was unrealistic and changed many times so the Seditionistas, as they were called, only launched small raids into Texas from the state of Tamaulipas, Mexico. Norias Ranch is located about seventy miles north of Brownsville and about sixty miles from Kingsville. At the time, Norias was the headquarters for the southernmost portion of the 825,000-acre King Ranch and was also used by the Missouri Pacific Railroad to water their trains. The site itself resembled a small town; it included a large two story wooden ranch house, owned by Caesar Kleberg, a small train station, a section house, a corral and a few other buildings. On August 7, Caesar Kleberg was in Kingsville when he learned that a large group of armed Mexican men were riding on horseback through the Sauz grazing division of the King Ranch with the intention of attacking Norias. Kleberg immediately informed the United States Army commandant at Fort Brown, near Brownsville, Texas, who informed Adjutant General Henry Hutchings. Hutchings organized a force of thirteen Texas Rangers, including Captains Harry (or Henry) Ransom, Monroe Fox, and George J. Head, plus eight cavalrymen, under Corporal Watson Adams, to go to the Norias Ranch by train and investigate the situation. Upon arriving, the ranch foreman, Tom Tate, led Hutchings, the Texas Rangers, and a few local peace officers to the Sauz Ranch. While they were gone a second train arrived at about 5:30 pm, dropping off the Customs Inspectors D. P. Gay, Joe Taylor, and Marcus Hinds, as well as a deputy sheriff of Cameron County, Gordon Hill. All four were heavily armed with rifles and pistols.

Raid
Now there were a total of seventeen men, four women and one baby girl at the ranch, including Sheriff Hill, the eight soldiers, the three customs inspectors, four male ranchers and one railroad foreman. Later that night, as the sun was going down, the people at Norias had just finished eating dinner when they retired to the porch of the ranch house. Shortly thereafter, Inspector Hinds noticed a group of men on horseback approaching the ranch from the south, displaying a red flag. Initially he thought the men were Texas Rangers, returning from their patrol, but when they closed to about 250 yards away they opened fire on the house.  At the same time, a second group of rebels attacked from the east and opened fire within ninety yards of the Americans as they took cover behind the railroad embankment near the section house to return the fire. One of the ranchers, a black man named Albert Edmonds, telephoned Caesar Kleberg, asking for his help. Kleberg told Edmonds that there was a train in Kingsville loaded with "armed men, supplies, and medical people" but it could not leave because there was no one yet available to drive it to Norias. When the train did finally arrive the fighting was already over. The four women dispersed when the shooting began. One hid inside a boxcar with her husband, the railroad foreman, and her baby while two others went into the ranch house. A fourth woman, named Manuela Flores, hid inside the section house. Within the first few minutes of the battle, four of the Americans were wounded, including two soldiers and the ranchers George Forbes and Frank Martin. Forbes got hit in the lungs as he was bringing the wounded into the house, and both he and Frank Martin later died of their wounds. Dad Martin, the father of Frank, shot and killed the horse of the Mexican commander and stopped the initial charge, but the rebels dismounted and regrouped for a second attack on foot. Eventually the Americans withdrew to the safety of the ranch house but its thin walls provided little protection. Because of this, Dad Martin had the two women and the wounded covered in mattresses while he and the remaining men went back outside to draw the Mexicans' fire away from the house.

Once outside the Americans took cover behind a roll of wire fencing and a steel trough. When they returned fire the rebels took cover in the section house, a second building nearby, and from behind a pile of railroad ties. It was at this time that Manuela Flores was found hiding and subsequently killed by the raiders. When the defenders began to run low on ammunition Dad Martin ran from behind the wires back inside the house. He first checked on the women and the wounded, telling them to stay down under the mattresses and then he retrieved the ammunition and went back outside to distribute it. All of this was done under a "steady stream of bullets" but Dad survived the two-hour engagement unhurt. Towards the end of the fight, the Mexicans launched one final charge on foot to dislodge the defenders before the sun set, but they were beaten back again, having made it to within forty yards of the Americans' position. During the charge, Inspector Joe Taylor shot and killed the rebel leader; however, it remains uncertain as to who the leader actually was. After being repulsed again the Mexicans retreated to their horses and strapped the wounded to them. According to the ranchers Pedro Longorio, Luis Solis, and Macario Longorio, at 2:00 am, on August 9, a group of fifty-two rebels, under the command of Antonio Roche and Dario Morada, forced them to feed and water their horses at the Cerritos division of the King Ranch. Another report says that Luis de la Rosca led some of the raiders and that his band of fifteen men joined with about twenty-five others for the attack on Norias.  Either way, there were between forty-five and seventy Mexican rebels who participated in the fight, at least four of whom were killed and as many as twelve others were wounded.

Aftermath

The Americans reported that they had killed five of the Mexicans but only four appear in pictures taken of the dead on the following morning of August 9 when Hutchings and the Texas Rangers returned. However, Dad Martin claimed that he was tasked with burying the bodies of ten rebels at the ranch on the day after the raid and that the five wounded Mexicans who were strapped to horses later died and were buried by their comrades somewhere on the ranch. One of the men at Norias tried to have Hutchings and the rangers pursue the raiders but by the time they were finished having their photographs taken with the dead rebels, the remaining raiders had fled across the Rio Grande into Mexico. While crossing at a place called Los Cavazos, the rebels encountered United States Army troops and some other Texas Rangers. During another brief fight, as many as a dozen more rebels were killed, with very few actually making it back to Mexico. A wounded rebel later said that he and the others thought there were only a few men at the ranch and that they planned to rob the store, destroy the night train, and burn Kleberg's ranch house. Dad Martin later discovered that the rebels had placed a price on his head when he captured a Mexican bounty hunter. Dad searched the Mexican and in his pocket he found a piece of paper with his name on it, as well as the names of the others who defended Norias and that of Caesar Kleberg and his father Bob. Next to the names was written down the amount of reward money offered for each victim.

See also
Ruby Murders
Garza Revolution
Las Cuevas War

Citations

References
 
 

Conflicts in 1915
1915 in Texas
1915 in Mexico
History of Mexico
History of Texas
Battles of the Mexican Revolution involving the United States
Battles of the Mexican Revolution
American frontier
Military raids
August 1915 events